The Spanish Democratic Party (PADE) was a conservative political party in Spain, created as a split from the centre-right People's Party in 1996. Its chairman was Juan Ramón Calero Rodríguez, former PP spokesperson in Congress.

Ideology
It regarded itself as being to the right of the People's Party, with some sources regarding it as a far-right party. This was denied by the party, which described itself as christian humanist, liberal-reformist and moderate.

References

Defunct political parties in Spain
Political parties established in 1996
Political parties disestablished in 2008
1996 establishments in Spain
2008 disestablishments in Spain
Far-right political parties in Spain